The next Tasmanian state election is scheduled to be held on or before Saturday 28 June 2025 to elect all 25 members plus an extra 10 new seats to the House of Assembly. The Liberal government, currently led by Premier of Tasmania Jeremy Rockliff, will attempt to win a fourth term against the Labor opposition, led by Rebecca White.

The House of Assembly uses the proportional Hare-Clark system, and will elect 35 members from five seven-member constituencies. Upper house elections in the 15-seat single-member district Legislative Council use full-preference instant-runoff voting, with election dates staggered and conducted separately from lower house state elections. The election will be conducted by the Tasmanian Electoral Commission.

Date
Under section 23 of the Constitution Act 1934, the House of Assembly expires four years from the return of the writs for its election, which took place on 1 May 2021. The Governor must issue writs of election between five and ten days thereafter. Nominations must close on a date seven to 21 days after the issuance of the writ, and polling day must be a Saturday between 15 and 30 days after nominations close.

Background

After the snap 2021 Tasmanian state election, the Liberal Party successfully won a majority of seats in the Tasmanian House of Assembly. A Liberal MP for Braddon, Adam Brooks, resigned on 14 May 2021 after being charged with firearms offences by Queensland law enforcement. These offences were unauthorised possession of a Category H weapon, unauthorised possession of explosives, and dealing with identity documents. Premier Peter Gutwein said that "I made the decision that under the circumstances of both his mental health and in terms of the fact that he's now facing these new charges, that he won't take his seat in parliament." Greens leader Cassy O'Connor said that "there are now very serious questions to answer about whether or not he was ever considered a legitimate candidate by the Liberal Party", given he resigned "the day the polls [were] declared". Prior claims from women were made before the 2021 election, saying they were catfished by Brooks under the alias "Terry Brooks".

Rebecca White resigned as Labor leader on 15 May 2021, endorsing shadow treasurer David O'Byrne to replace her. On 15 June 2021, it was announced that O'Byrne had been elected as leader of the Tasmanian Labor Party against opponent Shane Broad, winning 72% of the members' vote and 75% of party delegates. After allegations of him sexting and kissing a woman without her consent were revealed, David O'Byrne stood aside from his role as leader of the Labor Party for the length of an investigation on 30 June 2021, with Anita Dow acting as leader during the interim. This was followed by O'Byrne announcing he would resign as leader on 4 July 2021. On 7 July 2021, Rebecca White was elected as leader after a meeting of the Labor parliamentary caucus.

On 4 April 2022, Premier Peter Gutwein announced he will quit politics, resigning as Premier and as a member for Bass following the appointment of a new Premier. Jeremy Rockliff, who had been the deputy Liberal leader for 16 years, officially replaced Gutwein as Premier on 8 April 2022, with Bass MP Michael Ferguson as his deputy.

On 25 May 2022, Premier Rockliff announced his intention to table a bill in State Parliament to restore the state's House of Assembly to 35 seats before the end of 2022. The Premier's proposed bill would restore the size of parliament to its original number before the reductions to 25 seats kicked in at the 1998 election. The proposed change would mean Tasmanians will vote for 35 members of the House of Assembly in the next state election. The proposed bill was supported by the Liberals, Labor, Greens and independent Kristie Johnston.

Registered parties

8 parties are registered with the Tasmanian Electoral Commission.
 Animal Justice Party
 Australian Federation Party Tasmania 
 Australian Labor Party (Tasmanian Branch)
 The Liberal Party of Australia, Tasmanian Division
 Shooters, Fishers and Farmers Party Tasmania
 Tasmanian Greens
 Jacqui Lambie Network
 The Local Party

Opinion polling
Polling was regularly conducted for Tasmanian state politics by Enterprise Marketing and Research Services (EMRS). The sample size for each EMRS poll is 1,000 Tasmanian voters.

Voting intention

Preferred Premier

References

Elections in Tasmania
Future elections in Australia
2020s in Tasmania